This article lists the results for the Serbia national football team from 2006 to 2009. Serbia played the non-FIFA Basque Country team on 27 December 2006; this did not contribute to ranking points or individual cap totals.

List of matches

2006

2007

2008

2009

See also
Serbia national football team results
Serbia national football team results (2010–19)
Serbia national football team results (2020–29)

Notes

References

External links
Results at RSSSF 

2006-09
National
National
National
National